Grant Parish Detention Center is a parish jail in Grant Parish, Louisiana.

Parish jails in Louisiana